Magdalena (minor planet designation: 318 Magdalena) is a main belt asteroid orbiting the Sun. It was discovered by Auguste Charlois on 24 September 1891 in Nice.

On April 15, 2005, UT Magdalena occulted a 10.7 mag star in the constellation Scutum for observers along a path across Australia.

Measurements made with the IRAS observatory give a diameter of 106.08 ± 0.25 km and a geometric albedo of 0.03 ± 0.01. By comparison, the MIPS photometer on the Spitzer Space Telescope gives a diameter of 105.32 ± 11.11 km and a geometric albedo of 0.03 ± 0.01.

Alternative Rock group The Pixies named one of their songs after the asteroid on their album Indie Cindy.

References

External links 
 
 

000318
Discoveries by Auguste Charlois
Named minor planets
000318
18910924